Point Reyes Station (formerly, Marin and Olema Station) is a small unincorporated town in western Marin County, California, United States. Point Reyes Station is located along State Route 1 and is a gateway to the Point Reyes National Seashore, an extremely popular national preserve. The Point Reyes Station census-designated place (CDP) covers the unincorporated town and adjacent development to the north, with a total population of 895 as of the 2020 census.

Geography

History
Once land of the Coast Miwok Indians, Point Reyes Station gets its name from the nearby Point Reyes Peninsula (a major peninsula sticking out into the Pacific Ocean) and its status as a terminus stop on the North Pacific Coast Railroad connecting Cazadero to the Sausalito ferry.

Point Reyes Station is very close to the San Andreas Fault, which was responsible for the 1906 San Francisco earthquake. At one time, the epicenter of the quake was thought to be near Olema. A walking tour of the fault can be taken from the Point Reyes National Seashore's Visitor Center.

The place was called "Olema Station" when the railroad arrived in 1875. The Point Reyes post office opened in 1882. Its name changed thrice in 1891: first to Marin, then back to Point Reyes, and finally to the modern Point Reyes Station.

Demographics

The 2010 United States Census reported that Point Reyes Station had a population of 848. The racial makeup of Point Reyes Station was 725 (85.5%) White, 7 (0.8%) African American, 3 (0.4%) Native American, 10 (1.2%) Asian, 73 (8.6%) from other races, and 30 (3.5%) from two or more races. Hispanic or Latino of any race were 155 persons (18.3%).

The Census reported that 100% of the population lived in households.

There were 412 households, out of which 87 (21.1%) had children under the age of 18 living in them, 168 (40.8%) were opposite-sex married couples living together, 19 (4.6%) had a female householder with no husband present, 21 (5.1%) had a male householder with no wife present.  There were 19 (4.6%) unmarried opposite-sex partnerships, and 4 (1.0%) same-sex married couples or partnerships. 172 households (41.7%) were made up of individuals, and 90 (21.8%) had someone living alone who was 65 years of age or older. The average household size was 2.06.  There were 208 families (50.5% of all households); the average family size was 2.84.

The population was spread out, with 155 people (18.3%) under the age of 18, 48 people (5.7%) aged 18 to 24, 152 people (17.9%) aged 25 to 44, 299 people (35.3%) aged 45 to 64, and 194 people (22.9%) who were 65 years of age or older.  The median age was 51.1 years. For every 100 females, there were 81.2 males.  For every 100 females age 18 and over, there were 81.4 males.

The homeowner vacancy rate was 0%; the rental vacancy rate was 6.8%. 50.6% of the population lived in owner-occupied housing units and 49.4% lived in rental housing units.

Economy
A number of agricultural companies, many using organic and sustainable practices, are located there, including Cowgirl Creamery and Point Reyes Farmstead Cheese Company. Marin Organic operates out of the city.

See also
 List of people from Marin County, California

References

External links

West Marin Chamber of Commerce
West Marin Citizen homepage
The Point Reyes Light homepage
Point Reyes Station Public Library
KWMR - West Marin Public Radio

Census-designated places in Marin County, California
West Marin
Census-designated places in California
Populated coastal places in California